James Michael "Jim" Dooley (born August 22, 1976) is an American film score composer.

Biography 
Dooley was born in New York City and studied music at New York University, majoring in music composition. After finishing the university he moved to Los Angeles, where he studied music with prolific film score composers Christopher Young, Elmer Bernstein and Leonard Rosenman. In 1999, Dooley started working for Hans Zimmer as his chief technical assistant. He works in Santa Monica in Zimmer's film music studio Remote Control Productions (formerly Media Ventures). He composed, arranged, and orchestrated music for films like Spirit: Stallion of the Cimarron and The Da Vinci Code. He also composed music for inFAMOUS 2 and the Epic Mickey series and has collaborated with Celldweller and Tarja Turunen. He released his debut album, Veiled Nation, in 2013.

Work

Film

TV

Video games

Other

Awards

References

External links 

1976 births
American film score composers
American male film score composers
American television composers
Living people
Male television composers
Steinhardt School of Culture, Education, and Human Development alumni
St. Francis Preparatory School alumni
Video game composers